Gymnancyla craticulella is a species of snout moth in the genus Gymnancyla. It was described by Ragonot in 1887, and is known from Russia, Kyrgyzstan and Uzbekistan.

The wingspan is about 25 mm.

References

Moths described in 1887
Phycitini
Moths of Asia